Gazoryctra macilentus is a moth of the family Hepialidae. It is known from Siberia, the Russian Far East, Japan, Kazakhstan and Mongolia.

References

Moths described in 1851
Hepialidae
Moths of Asia